This article shows the rosters of all participating teams at the 2022 FIVB Volleyball Women's Club World Championship in Antalya, Turkey.

Dentil Praia Clube
The following is the roster of the Brazilian club Dentil Praia Clube in the 2022 FIVB Volleyball Women's Club World Championship.

Eczacıbaşı Dynavit
The following is the roster of the Turkish club Eczacıbaşı Dynavit in the 2022 FIVB Volleyball Women's Club World Championship.

Gerdau Minas
The following is the roster of the Brazilian club Gerdau Minas in the 2022 FIVB Volleyball Women's Club World Championship.

Imoco Volley Conegliano
The following is the roster of the Italian club Imoco Volley Conegliano in the 2022 FIVB Volleyball Women's Club World Championship.

Kuanysh
The following is the roster of the Kazakhstani club Kuanysh in the 2022 FIVB Volleyball Women's Club World Championship.

VakıfBank İstanbul
The following is the roster of the VakıfBank İstanbul in the FIVB Volleyball Women's Club World Championship.

References

Club
FIVB